Tao Kan (259 – 30 July 334), courtesy name Shixing, formally Duke Huan of Changsha, was a Chinese military general and politician during the Jin dynasty. He was the great-grandfather of the Jin Dynasty poet Tao Yuanming.

Early career 
Tao Kan was born under the rule of Eastern Wu, and his father was an Eastern Wu general.  Early in his career, he was a low-level county official, but subsequently on the recommendation of the commandery governor Zhang Kui, he was sent to the Jin prime minister Zhang Hua for commission; however, Zhang Hua, who did not favor people from former Eastern Wu lands, did not give him a commission, and he ended up serving on staff of the general Sun Xiu (孫秀, not to be confused with the Eastern Wu emperor or Sima Lun's advisor), a member of the Eastern Wu imperial household.

Later, Tao served on the staff of the famed Jing Province (荊州, modern Hubei and Hunan) governor Liu Hong.  Liu once personally told him, "When I was serving on General Yang Hu's staff, he told me that I would one day have his position.  Now, I tell you that you will one day have my position."  Tao later played a large role in Liu's suppression of the rebel Chen Min.  He later served successively as several commanderies' governor, and later served under the general Wang Dun, participating in Wang's campaign against various agrarian rebels, including the powerful Du Tao.  For his accomplishments, Wang commissioned Tao as the governor of Jing Province, fulfilling Liu's prior words.

However, Wang soon became apprehensive about Tao's abilities.  In 315, he suddenly detained Tao and ordered him to be the governor of Guang Province (廣州, modern Guangdong) -- considered to be a demotion and an exile.  He even considered executing Tao, but fearful that killing Tao would lead to reactions from the general Zhou Fang, whose daughter was Tao's daughter-in-law, he allowed Tao to report to Guang Province, which had been in control of the semi-rebel Wang Ji.  Upon arrival in Guang Province, Tao defeated Wang easily and pacified the province.  As the provincial affairs did not require him to work all day, Tao developed the exercise habit of moving a hundred bricks a day from his study to his courtyard, and then from the courtyard back to the study, reasoning that he needed to continue to exercise himself for future campaigns to recover central China.  He was therefore often cited in Chinese history as an example of the importance of physical exercise.

Later career 
When Wang Dun rebelled against Emperor Yuan in 322, Emperor Yuan commissioned Tao to be the governor of Jiang Province (江州, modern Jiangxi) with intent that Tao participate in attacking Wang's rear.  However, Tao sent only a small force to assist Sima Cheng the governor of Xiang Province (湘州, modern Hunan), who was loyal to Emperor Yuan, and Tao's force was insufficient to prevent Sima Cheng from being defeated and killed by Wang.  After Wang was successful in capturing the capital Jiankang and forcing Emperor Yuan to submit to his will, he kept Tao at Guang Province.  Subsequently, after Wang died during his campaign to overthrow Emperor Ming in 324, Emperor Ming made Tao the governor of Jing Province and military commander of the western provinces.  He was effective in that role—and the military improvements he made later helped to pave the way for Huan Wen's later campaign to conquer Cheng Han in 347.

However, Tao became resentful when Emperor Ming died in 325 and failed to list him among the officials who were promoted or honored—leading him to suspect that Emperor Ming's brother-in-law, the regent Yu Liang, had erased his name.  As a result, Yu became apprehensive of Tao, and subsequently, when Su Jun rebelled in 327 and attacked Jiankang, he ordered Wen Jiao the governor of Jiang Province not to come to Jiankang's aid but instead defend against a possible Tao attack, and this contributed to Jiankang's fall to Su in 328.

After Jiankang fell, Yu fled to Wen's domain, and they considered how they could defeat Su.  Wen's cousin Wen Chong suggested that they offer the title of the supreme commander to Tao, and they did so.  However, Tao was still resentful of Yu and therefore initially refused.  Eventually, however, after his anger was over, he accepted, and he, Wen, and Yu combined their forces and headed east to Jiankang.  In winter 328, during a battle with Su, Su was killed, and they subsequently defeated the remnants of Su's army in 329.  For his contributions, Tao was created the Duke of Changsha.  When he later suppressed the rebellion of Guo Mo in 330, he was given the military command over eight provinces—an extreme authority not even matched by Wang Dun.  As he grew ill in 334, he resigned and tried to retire to his dukedom of Changsha, but died on the way.

References 

 Book of Jin, vol. 66.
 Zizhi Tongjian, vols. 85, 86, 87, 88, 89, 90, 91, 92, 93, 94, 95.

259 births
334 deaths
Generals from Jiangxi
Jin dynasty (266–420) generals
Jin dynasty (266–420) politicians
People of Eastern Wu
Politicians from Jiujiang